Ohio's 1st senatorial district has historically represented areas located in northwestern Ohio.  A multi-county district, it currently comprises the counties Hancock, Hardin, Putnam, Henry, Williams, Defiance, Paulding, and Van Wert and portions of the counties Fulton, Logan, and Auglaize. It encompasses Ohio House districts 81, 82 and 83. It has a Cook PVI of R+11.  Until his resignation, the current Ohio Senator was Republican Rob McColley.  He resides in Napoleon, Ohio, a city located in Henry County.

List of senators

References

External links
Ohio's 1st district senator at the 130th Ohio General Assembly official website

Ohio State Senate districts